Girardot Municipality may refer to:
Girardot, Cundinamarca, Colombia
Girardot Municipality, Aragua, Venezuela
Girardot Municipality, Cojedes, Venezuela

Municipality name disambiguation pages